Walter Lamont was a Scottish footballer who played as a right winger.

Career
Lamont played club football for Apsley, Pilgrims and Corinthians, and made one appearance for Scotland in 1885.

References

Year of birth missing
Place of birth missing
Scottish footballers
Scotland international footballers
Association football wingers
Year of death missing
Place of death missing